Budai is a semi-historical Chinese monk who is venerated as a deity in Chinese Buddhism.

Budai may also refer to:

Places
 Budai, Chiayi, Taiwanese township
 Budăi (disambiguation), several places in Romania and Moldova

People
 László Budai, former Hungarian football player
 Pal Budai Jewish composer
 Buday, variant spelling Budai, several surnames

Other uses
 Buday, Japanese parrotfish, Calotomus japonicus